Let Me Be the One is the sixth studio album by American R&B singer Angela Bofill, released on October 25, 1984 by Arista Records.

Let Me Be the One was produced by David Frank and Mic Murphy who, at the time, were enjoying much success as the System. Let Me Be the One was much more synth-heavy R&B flavored than her earlier jazz-oriented works. The title song peaked at No. 84 on the Billboard R&B Chart.

Track listing
Side one
"Can't Slow Down" (David Frank, Mic Murphy) – 5:09
"Let Me Be the One" (Angela Bofill, Rick Suchow, Alan Palanker) – 3:28
"Who Knows You Better" (Stephen Geyer, Gary Stockdale) – 3:31
"You're Always There" (Angela Bofill, David Frank, Mic Murphy) – 5:19

Side two
"Getting into Love" (David Frank, Mic Murphy) – 4:41
"No Love in Sight" (Angela Bofill, Loree Gold) – 3:24
"Love Me for Today" (Angela Bofill, Alan Palanker, Derrik Hoitsma) – 4:23
"This is the Start" (David Frank, Mic Murphy, Paul Pesco, Ian McDonald) – 4:38

Personnel
Credits are adapted from the Let Me Be the One liner notes.
Angela Bofill – vocals
Alan Palanker – keyboards
Mario Salvati – engineer
Rick Sanchez – engineer
Alex Haas – assistant engineer
Michael Brauer – engineer, mixing
Carl Beatty – mixing
Mickey Leonard – guitar
Paul Pesco – guitar, drum programming
William "Doc" Powell – guitar
David Frank – keyboards, producer, drum programming
Sandy Bofill – background vocals
Cindy Mizelle – background vocals
Lisa Fischer – background vocals
Michelle Cobbs – background vocals
Mic Murphy – background vocals, producer
Marc Russo – saxophone
Eluriel Tinker Barfield – bass guitar
Yogi Horton – drums

Chart history

References

External links

Angela Bofill albums
1984 albums
Arista Records albums